The Restless and the Damned (also known as L'Ambitieuse) is a 1959 French-Australian film co produced by Lee Robinson. It was shot on location in Tahiti and the Tuamotu Islands. There are French and English-language versions.

Synopsis
In Tahiti, an ambitious woman, Dominique, promotes the fortunes of her husband, George, by extracting money from George's family to finance his operations and seducing a prospective business partner. But when George decides to leave her for another woman, Claire, she tries to kill him.

Cast
 Edmond O'Brien as Buchanan
 Richard Basehart as George Rancourt
 Andrea Parisy as Dominique
 Nicole Berger as Claire
 Nigel Lovell as Andre
Reg Lye as Mathews
Jean Marchat as Uncle Albert
Denise Vernac as Aunt Edwige

Production
The film was shot in late 1958. Originally Lee Robinson was to direct the English-language version but after a few days Yves Allégret directed both.

Rafferty and Robinson contributed £40,000 of the film's budget, coming from hire of studio facilities to two films shot in Tahiti and their involvement in several episodes of the US documentary series, High Adventure.

Edmond O'Briens fee was more than $200,000. He was cast on the strength of his performance in The Girl Can't Help It("it was considered a comedy of importance" said Dorfman) and his Oscar. The film was also known as The Ambitious.

Release
The film was a box office failure and did not achieve cinema release in England, the United States and Australia and ended the feature film partnership of Chips Rafferty and Lee Robinson. It was sold to American TV under the title The Climbers.

References

External links

The Restless and the Damned at National Film and Sound Archive
The Restless and the Damned at Oz Movies

1959 films
English-language French films
1959 adventure films
Films directed by Yves Allégret
Films set in French Polynesia
Australian multilingual films
French multilingual films
French-Australian culture
1950s multilingual films